Athrips montana is a moth of the family Gelechiidae. It is found in China (Gansu).

The wingspan is about 18 mm. The forewings are uniform grey and the hindwings are light grey. Adults are on wing in July.

Etymology
The species name refers to the site where the species was collected and is derived from Latin montanus (meaning mountainous).

References

Moths described in 2009
Athrips
Moths of Asia